David Gabrovšek (born September 18, 1994) is a Slovenian professional basketball player for Karditsa of the Greek Basket League.

College career
Gabrovšek played college basketball with Southwest Baptist and Missouri Baptist from 2013 to 2017.

Professional career
In May 2022,  Gabrovšek was named the Icelandic Cup after turning in 29 points and 7 rebounds in Stjarnan's 93–85 cup finals victory against Þór Þorlákshöfn.

On August 12, 2022, Gabrovšek moved to ASK Karditsas of the Greek Basket League.

References

External links
Proballers Profile
RealGM Profile
Eurobasket.com Profile

Living people
1994 births
Power forwards (basketball)
Slovenian men's basketball players
David Gabrovšek
David Gabrovšek